Cymatura mechowi is a species of beetle in the family Cerambycidae. It was described by Quednfeldt in 1882. It is known from Tanzania, Malawi, Angola, and Mozambique.

References

Xylorhizini
Beetles described in 1882